Princess Point is located in the south east corner of Cootes Paradise marsh in Hamilton, Ontario, and is the principal access point to the surrounding natural areas. The property is part of the Cootes Paradise Nature Sanctuary owned and managed by the Royal Botanical Gardens (RBG).  The low waterside peninsula has made Princess Point a natural gathering place for people for thousands of years. Archeological discoveries have indicated that between 1000 and 800 AD the Middle Woodland Culture brought agriculture in the form of corn production to the region.  The discovery of this has given rise to the term the Princess Point Complex, referring to this archeological group of native people that cover a large region of eastern North America.

The current parking area was created in the 1950s by the RBG through substantial infilling of the marshland, and for several decades the area was manicured parkland.  The site has never been farmed and so a number of unusual species of oak trees remain. The site continues to be used as an archeological field school in a collaboration between the RBG and the University of Toronto. The site provides both canoe access to Cootes Paradise and starting point for the waterfront and natural trails of the area.

References

Further reading
Laking, Leslie. Love, Sweat and Soil: A History of Royal Botanical Gardens from 1930 to 1981. Royal Botanical Gardens Auxiliary, 2006. .
Stothers, David Marvyn. The Princess Point Complex. Ottawa: National Museums of Canada, 1977. (Ph.D. Thesis)

Geography of Hamilton, Ontario
Protected areas of Hamilton, Ontario